Yuliana Doncheva Petkova (born 25 June 1965) is a Bulgarian politician, businesswoman and television personality.

Life 
Born in Shumen, Doncheva is a graduate of the University of Architecture, Civil Engineering and Geodesy, where her specialty was "Geodesy, Cartography and Photogrammetry". She also earned a degree in "European Integration and International Economic Relations" from the UNWE.

Between 2001 and 2005, Doncheva sat in the National Parliament as a member of the NDSV, being vice-chairperson of the parliamentary group of the party. She subsequently entered the ranks of the New Age (Bulgarian: Новото Време) party, remaining part of it until August 2012.

Doncheva is married to mixed martial artist Stanislav Nedkov.

References 

Bulgarian television personalities
1965 births
Living people
People from Shumen
Members of the National Assembly (Bulgaria)
National Movement for Stability and Progress politicians
University of National and World Economy alumni